Bodybuilding competitions at the 2022 South American Games in Asuncion, Paraguay were held on October 2, 2022 at the Fan Fest - COP

Schedule
All events were   schedule on 2 October

Medal summary

Medal table

Medalists

Participation
Nine nations participated in bodybuilding events of the 2022 South American Games.

References

External links
RESULTADOS DEL CONCURSO OFICIAL

Bodybuilding
South American Games
2022